Andrés García La Calle (February 4, 1909 – April 8, 1975) (sometimes Lacalle, but his real name was Andrés García Calle) was the squadron leader of the 1st fighter squadron of the Spanish Republic and later Commander of all the fighter units of the Spanish Republican Air Force during the Spanish Civil War.

Biography
Born in Sestao (Biscay), in Spain, he started his career in 1929 as an NCO after having got his license in a private aero club. He saw action immediately on the break of the civil war flying with all outdated planes for the time, like the Nieuport Ni-52 Delage, the Hawker Fury, the Loire 46 and the Dewoitine 371 where, nevertheless, he scored his first three victories. He was soon promoted to Lieutenant. 

Near September 1936 upon the arrival of the more modern Soviet fighters Polikarpov I-15 (Chato) and Polikarpov I-16 (Mosca) he participated in the first squadrons organized by the Soviets, defending Madrid and contributing to the endurance of the city despite the terrorist air bombing attacks against civilians by German and Italian units. In November of the same year he took command as Captain of the 1st Fighter Squadron, organized now under Spanish control. It became known as the ‘Lacalle Squadron’, composed of 25 planes, the leader and another six groups of four. One of these groups included only American pilots, and was named the ‘American Patrol’. The most prominent of them, Frank Glasgow Tinker, has left a detailed description on the character of Lacalle, in his book Some Still Live. The other three were Albert Baumler, Harold Evans Dahl and Benjamin Leider, who was killed early in the squadron's career. Lacalle was very young for his duties (Tinker called him ‘The Kid’), almost careless as a child when driving a car but extremely skilled while flying a plane. Tinker was amazed that Lacalle scored victories flying the very difficult Ni-52. As a leader, Lacalle was careful not to expose his fighters to unnecessary risks, as he knew how difficult it was to replace them, but when the duty called he was ready to fight under any conditions.

During the Battle of Jarama Lacalle demonstrated the effectiveness of his squadron by making multiple ground attacks to support closely the republican troops, and was thus nicknamed ‘The hero of Jarama’. During the Battle of Guadalajara he ordered his planes to fly under very poor visibility conditions that surprised the Italian attackers; their columns stuck on the roads to Madrid were decimated. End of 1937 he was promoted to Major, and was sent to the Soviet Union for advanced training. On his return he was promoted to Lt. Colonel, and given the task of reorganizing all the fighter units. Most of his pilots in the ‘Lacalle Squadron’ led these new fighter groups. Lacalle himself was officially credited with 11 confirmed victories at that time, but this number might have been as high as 21. The possible reason for the discrepancy was that the mercenary American pilots in his unit were highly paid for their salaries and extra for their kills (US $1,000 in 1936), while the Spanish pilots were receiving some ten times less salary and no money for any kill. Lacalle was intentionally not keen in confirming any claims except the very obvious ones and so it went for his own kills. 

By the end of 1938 Lacalle found himself in an extremely hard position, desperately running out of equipment, material, planes, and mainly experienced pilots. He led the very last fighter operations after the Battle of the Ebro with only 30 fighters against some 550 of the combined German and Italian planes under Franco.

Exile
On February 6, 1939, Lacalle left from the Vilajuiga airfield for the Francazal aerodrome near Toulouse in his last I-16 fighter, leading a great part of the planes of the Spanish Republican Air Force to France so that they would not fall in the hands of the enemy. However, immediately upon landing Lacalle was arrested by the French authorities and was interned in the Argelès-sur-Mer concentration camp located near Perpignan, until he was able to escape to Mexico. He died in Santo Domingo, Dominican Republic, in 1975.

Lacalle was awarded three medals for his service, and wrote a book on the civil war, titled The Myths and the Truth (Mitos y Verdades).

His son is the Dominican-Mexican actor Andrés García.

See also
Spanish Republican Air Force
Spanish Air Force

References

External links
 The air war of the republicans: 1936 (Spanish)
 Article on Frank Tinker with references to Lacalle including his picture together with the 'American Patrol'

1909 births
1975 deaths
People from Sestao
Spanish aviators
Spanish emigrants to the Dominican Republic
Spanish military personnel of the Spanish Civil War (Republican faction)
Spanish refugees
Spanish Civil War flying aces
Spanish flying aces
Exiles of the Spanish Civil War in France
Spanish emigrants to Mexico